The Snuneymuxw First Nation (pronounced ) is located in and around the city of Nanaimo on east-central Vancouver Island, British Columbia, Canada. The nation previously had also occupied territory along the Fraser River, in British Columbia.

Prior to European colonization of the Americas and the creation of Indian reserves in the nineteenth century, this people occupied a wide region of south-central Vancouver Island, where they had lived for more than 5,000 years. Snuneymuxw Territory extended to the Gulf Islands, and the Fraser River in the British Columbia; it was in the centre of Coast Salish territory. Their language is Hul’qumi’num.

The Snuneymuxw First Nation operates Newcastle Island Marine Provincial Park.

Language 

The SFN speak the Hul'q'umi'num dialect of Hul’q’umi’num’, Halq'eméylem, hən̓q̓əmin̓əm. This is a Coast Salish language, part of the Salishan language family. 

According to the Snuneymuxw First Nation Language Needs Assessment report of January 2009, published by the First Peoples' Heritage Language & Culture Council (FPHLCC), of a total population of 1560 (with 550 on reserve and 1010 off-reserve), there were 25 people who spoke and understood the language fluently. Eleven of these persons were between the ages of 65–74, 13 were between the ages of 75–84, and one was 85 and over. There were 35 who understood and/or spoke the language somewhat. Four were between the ages of 25–44, 23 were between the ages of 45–54, and 8 were between the ages of 55–64. Some 25 people were learning the language. Of that group, 15 were between the ages of 15–19, 2 were between the ages of 25–44, 4 were between the ages of 45–54, and 4 were between the ages of 55–64.

The language assessment noted that the First Nation had four small reserves at the time. City water had been suspended in 1992 at one reserve because of contamination, and new infrastructure was not built for 20 years. This prevented development of the reserves for such needs as housing, and many people lived off-reserve.

History

Archeological excavations have revealed that the Snuneymuxw had a winter village and burial site in present-day Departure Bay dating to about 3,500 year BP. In 2007 the remains of about 15 individuals were uncovered at the construction site of a future condo development owned by developer Bruce McLay. Madrone Environmental Services from Duncan, BC conducted an archaeological excavation of the site.

Eventually remains of more than 80 people were uncovered. When the late Chief Viola Wyse requested that B.C. Premier Gordon Campbell protect the site, the province purchased it. For a time the site remained "sad, forlorn and neglected", surrounded by a bent chain-link fence and covered in straggled patches of weeds.

In March 2013, as part of the provincial reconciliation agreement with First Nations, this site was transferred to the Snuneymuxw. Referring to this discovery, 

The site of the former Moby Dick Hotel, 1000 Stewart Ave, Nanaimo, was the location of a Snuneymuxw village of historical importance to the First Nation. It is situated at the narrowest point of Newcastle Channel, separating Newcastle Island from Nanaimo.

Former Snuneymuxw Chief White had plans to construct modest facilities on Newcastle Island to deliver new kinds of programming on Coast Salish culture, Newcastle Island's coal mining history, the CPR history, and the canneries history as part of a heritage tourist destination. Snuneymuxw First Nation will be collaborating with Waterfront Holdings Ltd. on current and future waterfront development on Stewart Avenue. The First Nation operates Newcastle Island Marine Provincial Park.

Nanaimo Indian Hospital 
The Nanaimo Indian Hospital served Indian patients and was operated by the federal government of Canada on Snuneymuxw territory from 1946 to 1967. The system of state-run Indian hospitals was deeply intertwined with the institution of residential schools. Like the schools, the hospital system has been documented for having a history of physical and sexual abuse of Indigenous people.

In the summer of 2021, hundreds of unmarked graves were identified at the Kamloops Indian Residential School. Other First Nations began to undertake their own surveys of sites of local Indian schools.

In response, Steve Sxwithul'txw of the Penelakut First Nation, carver Tom LaFortune, and educator Michele Mundy started a GoFundMe campaign to help First Nations on Vancouver Island conduct their own research around sites of former residential school and the Indian hospital. They will use current technology that does not disturb the ground. On 15 September 2021, the group gave Snuneymuxw First Nation , to help the First Nation conduct a search and to identify possible unmarked graves in and around the former grounds of the hospital.

Territory and current land base 

Snuneymuxw Territory on the eastern coast of Vancouver Island, the Gulf Islands, and the Fraser River in the British Columbia was in the centre of Coast Salish territory.

They share  of non-exclusive traditional territory with other First Nations of Canada.

In March 2013 the Snuneymuxw First Nation received an additional 877 hectares of land, consisting of three parcels in the Mount Benson area, as part of a reconciliation agreement with the government. Ida Chong, B.C. aboriginal relations and reconciliation minister, announced at the Vancouver Island Conference Centre that the land was "intended to provide forestry-related economic opportunities to generate revenue and employment" for the SFN.

According to the AANRC Profiles, the Snuneymuxw First Nation, band number 648 had six very small reserves as of 2012. Before the March 2013 reconciliation addition, the Snuneymuxw total reserve land base had consisted of 266 hectares, with the community historically divided into four small, numbered reserves on the shores of Nanaimo Harbour and Nanaimo River, and two tiny reserves at Gabriola Island. On a per capita basis, the Snuneymuxw land base was the smallest reserve land base in British Columbia. In January 2013, two reserves at Nanaimo River were amalgamated into the third, and are now part of what is called the Nanaimo River Reserve. (See further information below.)

The small size and odd shapes and locations of these reserves are visible on the interactive map provided by Aboriginal Affairs and Northern Development Canada. Reserve 1, consisting of several city blocks, is between a railroad track and the main highway that goes through Nanaimo.

Three reserves were along the Nanaimo River: Reserve 2 on the east bank, and Reserves 3 and 4 on the west bank. The river and river banks are not reserve land. All three of these parcels are on the estuary and appear to be in a flood zone. These small reserves are bounded by the main Island Highway, Duke Point Highway and Cedar Road. Although surrounded by the city of Nanaimo, they were not fully provided with water and sewage infrastructure, which resulted in underdevelopment of this area.

There were 337 residents in 2011.
There were 26 residents in 2011. It has been dissolved and amalgamated with Nanaimo River Reserve.
Statistics Canada provides a precise map. There were 81 residents in 2011. It has been dissolved and amalgamated with Nanaimo River Reserve.
As of January 2013, Nanaimo River Reserve, with 287 residents, was listed as having undergone an amalgamation, absorbing Nanaimo River 2 and Nanaimo River 3, which were dissolved as separate reserves.

 Ma-guala 6 (AANRC number 06820) is located in Nanaimo District.

Governance 

Snuneymuxw First Nation is governed by an elected Chief and Council. On 7 December 2013 Chief John Gordon (Gord) Wesley was elected with 253 votes out of 499. Five Councillors were also elected for up to a four-year term. Elections are carried out in accordance with the Snuneymuxw First Nation Election Code (2007) & Regulations (2011).

Demographics 
The Snuneymuxw First Nation number is 648. The band's population is 1,663, and  65 percent of Snuneymuxw people live off-reserve.

Treaty rights 

According to their official website, the SFN "are one of the few First Nations in BC that has a pre-confederation treaty with the Crown." The Snuneymuxw have treaty rights pursuant to the Treaty of 1854, one of the Douglas Treaties. This was confirmed by the landmark R. v. White and Bob litigation of the early to mid-1960s, wherein the treaty was confirmed and enforced. Provincial jurisdiction was ousted.

In October 2012, Chief Doug White met with UN Special Rapporteur James Anaya. Chief White argued that the Canadian federal government "has consistently failed to honour the Treaty of 1854" and has repeatedly broken the Treaty of 1854 during land negotiations. Anaya observed that "based on his preliminary findings", treaty and aboriginal claims remain "persistently unresolved" throughout Canada". He noted that there is a heightened level of mistrust distrust "among aboriginal peoples toward government at both the federal and provincial levels."

In 1992, the Snuneymuxw First Nation filed the Thlap’qwum Specific Claim related to the loss of their 32-hectare reserve in downtown Nanaimo, saying that it was illegally taken by the crown in the 1880s. The claim was accepted by the Crown as valid in 2003. After negotiations, the two sides agreed to a settlement offer worth $49,148,121. In November 2016, the First Nation ratified a settlement agreement for the land. The nearly $50 million payment is the largest specific claim negotiated by a British Columbia first nation by a factor of 5. As part of the agreement, the nation can negotiate for an additional 32-hectare of land to be added to their reserve.

Social and economic development

Water and Sewage Infrastructure 

In 1992 groundwater contamination was found and the wells were closed on the Snuneymuxw First Nation Indian Reserve No. 2. For twenty years the community was forced to subsist using water trucks. In 2010 the city of Nanaimo announced plans for a new water treatment facility but had difficulty acquiring Crown land needed for the project. John Ruttan, Nanaimo Mayor acknowledged that without the assistance of Snuneymuxw First Nation Chief Doug White III in acquiring some Crown land, "it’s questionable whether we would have been able to achieve what we’ve done." The City of Nanaimo agreed to provide the water to Reserve 2 as part of "the overall agreement." The Snuneymuxw First Nation are paying $500,000 cost of the project. The new water infrastructure project will connect Reserve No. 2 to Nanaimo's water supply lines at 1125 Cedar Road to provide potable water.

The city and First Nation established an innovative mentoring program to expand the benefits of the new water system. In November 2012 SFN workers began job shadowing City of Nanaimo CUPE Local 401 water crews members to learn foundational skills in maintaining quality water systems. CUPE's long-term goal is to expand this pilot project to First Nations communities across Vancouver Island. According to Blaine Gurrie, CUPE Local 401 President and member of the Vancouver Island Water Watch Coalition, CUPE is working to assist SFN employees in the following ways:

Justice system 

Like other First Nations, the Snuneymuxw had a community system to regulate behavior based on restorative justice. They think it has elements that should be revived, for the sake of their people and culture.

In 2006 226 First Nations members were imprisoned in the Nanaimo Correctional Centre (NCC), a provincial prison on SFN traditional territory. That represented 21.2% of the prison population. In British Columbia the percentage of indigenous prisoners was 20% in 2004–5.

Citations

References

External links 
 Official Snuneymuxw First Nation site

Coast Salish governments
Mid Vancouver Island